Claudia Millian (also Millian-Minulescu; February 21, 1887 – September 21, 1961) was a Romanian poet.

Born in Bucharest, her father was Ion Millian, an engineer of Greek origin; her mother was Maria (née Negoescu). She attended primary and high school in Bucharest and Ploiești, followed by the Fine Arts School (1906-1911) and the Dramatic Arts Conservatory. She worked as an art teacher in Bucharest from 1918 to 1940. Her first published work appeared in 1906 in the Ploiești magazine Lumina, while her first volume was the 1914 Garoafe roșii. Other volumes include Cântări pentru pasărea albastră (1922) and Întregire (1936). Her first husband was journalist Christea N. Dumitrescu-Cridim; after their divorce, she married poet Ion Minulescu in April 1914. She received the Ordre des Palmes Académiques for her work in promoting Franco-Romanian cultural ties.

Bibliography
Garoafe roșii, Bucharest, 1914
Cântări pentru pasărea albastră, Bucharest, 1922
Întregire, Bucharest, 1936
Despre Ion Minulescu, Bucharest, 1968
Cartea mea de aduceri aminte (ed. M. Gafița), Bucharest, 1973
Cartea a patra (poems), Bucharest, 1974
Cântări pentru pasărea albastră (poems, ed. Elena Piru), Bucharest, 1975
Vreau să trăiesc (theatrical plays, ed. Nina Stănculescu), Bucharest, 1983

Notes

1887 births
1961 deaths
Writers from Bucharest
Romanian people of Greek descent
Romanian women poets
Romanian schoolteachers
20th-century Romanian poets
Caragiale National University of Theatre and Film alumni
20th-century Romanian women writers